Köstler, Koestler is a family surname.

Köstler, Koestler:

 Arthur Koestler (1905–1983), a Hungarian political writer
 The Koestler Trust, a charity
 Arthur Koestler, the title of a book by Mark Levene in 1984
 Arthur Koestler/Arrow in the Blue, the title of an autobiography by Arthur Koestler
 Living with Koestler: Mamaine Koestler's Letters 1945-51, a book about Arthur and Mamaine Koestler
 Arthur Koestler: The Story of a Friendship, the title of a book by George Mikes in 1983
 Mamaine Koestler, née Paget (1916–1954), the 2nd wife of Arthur Koestler
 Marco Köstler (b. 1973), a German musician
 Jonathan "John" Koestler, a fictional character in the 2009 film Knowing.

German-language surnames